Lauro Fred Cavazos Jr. (January 4, 1927 – March 15, 2022) was an American educator and politician. He served as the United States Secretary of Education, and was the first Hispanic to serve in the United States Cabinet.

Early life and education 
A sixth-generation Texan, he was born on the King Ranch near Kingsville, Texas, the son of Lauro F. Cavazos Sr. and the former Tomasa Quintanilla. His father served as foreman of the showcase Santa Gertrudis cattle division. Through his maternal ancestry, he was a descendant of Texas Revolution heroine Francita Alavez, the "Angel of Goliad". He was the brother of U.S. Army General Richard E. Cavazos.

He earned B.A. and M.A. degrees in zoology from Texas Tech University, and a Ph.D. in physiology in 1954 from Iowa State University (ISU) in Ames, Iowa. While in college, he was a member of Kappa Kappa Psi.

Career 
Following a stint on the faculties of Tufts University and the Medical College of Virginia, he served as Dean of the Tufts University School of Medicine from 1975 to 1980. From 1980 to 1988, he served as President of Texas Tech University. He was both the first alumnus and the first Hispanic to serve as Texas Tech president. 

A Democrat, Cavazos served as Secretary of Education from August 1988 to December 1990 during the Republican Reagan and George H. W. Bush administrations. He resigned in December 1990.  
   
Following his resignation as Secretary of Education, he returned to the faculty of Tufts University where he has served as Professor of Public Health and Family Medicine since then.

Awards 
In 2006, his alma mater Iowa State University awarded him the Distinguished Achievement Award, their highest honors.

Personal life
Cavazos was married to the former Peggy Ann Murdock; they had ten children and lived in Massachusetts. He died in Concord, Massachusetts, on March 15, 2022, at the age of 95.

References

External links
 Lauro F. Cavazos papers (Texas Tech Archives)
 Answers.com-Lauro Cavazos
 "Cancel Our Reservations" - Time Magazine article regarding use of frequent flier miles
 

1927 births
2022 deaths
20th-century American politicians
21st-century American zoologists
American politicians of Mexican descent
George H. W. Bush administration cabinet members
Hispanic and Latino American members of the Cabinet of the United States
Iowa State University alumni
Massachusetts Democrats
People from Kingsville, Texas
Politicians from Boston
Presidents of Texas Tech University
Reagan administration cabinet members
Texas Democrats
Texas Tech University alumni
Tufts University faculty
United States Secretaries of Education